Arrow Creek may refer to: 

Streams

 Arrow Creek (Fresno County, California)

 Arrow Creek (Fergus County, Montana)

Other
 Arrow Creek, Montana, an unincorporated community
 Battle of Arrow Creek (1861)

See also
 Arrow (disambiguation)
 Arrow River (disambiguation)
 River Arrow (disambiguation)